The East Fork High Rock Canyon Wilderness is a U S Wilderness Area in Nevada under the Bureau of Land Management. It is located on the northeast side of High Rock Canyon but does not include the 4x4 trail inside High Rock Canyon nor a 4x4 trail to the Yellow Hills.

See also 
Black Rock Desert-High Rock Canyon Emigrant Trails National Conservation Area

References

External links 
East Fork High Rock Canyon Wilderness page at Wilderness.net

Wilderness areas of Nevada
Protected areas of Humboldt County, Nevada
IUCN Category Ib
Protected areas of Washoe County, Nevada
Bureau of Land Management areas in Nevada
Protected areas established in 2000
2000 establishments in Nevada